The judo competitions at the 2012 Olympic Games in London were held from 28 July to 3 August at the ExCeL Exhibition Centre.

Qualification

Qualification was based on the world ranking list prepared by the International Judo Federation on 1 May 2012.

Medal table
Russia topped the medal table with three golds and five in total.

Medal summary

Men's events

Women's events

References

External links 

 
 
 
 

 
2012 Summer Olympics events
2012
Olympics
Olympics
Judo competitions in the United Kingdom